Cabras may refer to the following places:

 Cabras, Sardinia, a town in Italy
 Cabras Island, on Guam
 Pino Cabras (born 1968), Italian politician
 Ilha das Cabras, an island in the municipality of Ilhabela, São Paulo, Brazil
 Ilhéu das Cabras, an island of São Tomé and Príncipe
 Cabras Islets, Island in the Azores, Portugal